Plasmodium saurocaudatum is a parasite of the genus Plasmodium.

Description 
Like all Plasmodium species, P. saurocaudatum has both vertebrate and insect hosts. The vertebrate hosts for this parasite are reptiles.

The parasite was first described by Telford in 1983.

Geographical occurrence 
This species is found in Southeast Asia.

Clinical features and host pathology 
The only known host is the many-lined sun skink (Mabuya multifasciata).

References 

saurocaudatum